Moshe Menuhin (1893–1983) was an American Jewish writer and teacher of Hebrew.

Biography 
Menuhin was born Moshe Mnuchin in Gomel to a distinguished, religious Lithuanian Jewish family. He was the great great grandson of Rabbi Shneur Zalman of Liadi, the founder of Chabad Hassidism as well as Rabbi Levi Yitzchok of Berditchev.

When the family moved to the Yishuv, Moshe was sent to Orthodox Jewish schools, first to Yeshivas in Jerusalem, then to the Hebrew Gymnasia Herzlia in Jaffa - Tel Aviv.

In 1913 he came to the United States to complete his higher education, attending New York University where he studied mathematics, political science and education.

In late 1919 he and his wife Marutha (née Sher) became American citizens, and changed their surname to Menuhin.

He later moved to California, where he worked as a Hebrew teacher. 

His views were anti-Zionist, and were subject of controversy in the Jewish world. He was the author of The Decadence of Judaism in Our Time and Jewish Critics of Zionism, and of the family history The Menuhin Saga.

Family 
Moshe Menuhin was the father of renowned violinist Yehudi Menuhin and pianists Hephzibah Menuhin and Yaltah Menuhin.

Works 
The decadence of Judaism in our time. New York, Exposition Press, 1965 
"The Other Side of the Coin." Published circa 1967. A copy of which is held in the UN Library in Geneva.
Quo vadis Zionist Israel? A 1969 postscript to The decadence of Judaism in our time. Beirut, Institute for Palestine Studies, 1969
In memory of Count Folke Bernadotte of Sweden, United Nations mediator on Palestine New York : Arab Information Center, 1969
Jewish critics of Zionism : a testamentary essay, with the stifling and smearing of a dissenter New York : League of Arab States, Arab Information Center, 1974
The stifling and smearing of a dissenter By Moshe Menuhin
A Jewish child in Czarist Russia Moshe Menuhin describes life in a Jewish ghetto of Czarist Russia. Hollywood, Calif. : Center for cassette studies, 1976
The Menuhin saga: the autobiography of Moshe Menuhin. London : Sidgwick & Jackson 1984

References

External links
Like Father, Like Son: A Tribute to Moshe and Yehudi Menuhin, Grace Halsell, Washington Report on Middle East Affairs July 1996

1893 births
1983 deaths
American Orthodox Jews
American people of Belarusian-Jewish descent
Belarusian Jews
Expatriates in Ottoman Palestine
Herzliya Hebrew Gymnasium alumni
Emigrants from the Russian Empire to the United States
Jewish anti-Zionism in the United States
Jews in Ottoman Palestine
New York University alumni
People from California
People from Gomel